Heaven in This Hell is the third studio album by Australian singer and guitarist Orianthi. Produced by David A. Stewart, the album was released on Robo Records on 12 March 2013. Orianthi cited modern country and blues as the main inspirations on the album's sound on an interview for Guitar World in January 2013. A deluxe version with three extra tracks was released on 3 September 2013.

Track listing

Fire EP
Five of the songs from Heaven in This Hell were previously released on Fire, Orianthi's first EP. Fire was produced by David A. Stewart, and released independently on 13 October 2011.

Track listing

Personnel
Per liner notes.
 Orianthi – vocals, lead guitar, rhythm guitar, acoustic guitar, nylon string guitar, bass, 12 string guitar, banjo, foot stomps
 Tom Bukovac – guitars
 Michael Rhodes – bass
 Dan Dugmore – lap steel guitar
 Chad Cromwell – drums
 Mike Rojas – piano
 Jimmy Z. – harmonica
 Drea Rhenee – backing vocals
 Wendy Moten – backing vocals
 Shannon Forest – drums

Recording personnel
 David A. Stewart – producer, rhythm guitar
 Rob Christie – A&R, additional piano
 Ned Douglas – engineer
 John McBride – mixing
 Nathan Yarborough – assistant engineer
 Leland Elliott – assistant engineer
 Lowell Reynolds – assistant engineer

Chart positions

References

2013 albums
Orianthi albums